The World Group II was the second highest level of Fed Cup competition in 2017. The winning nations advanced to the World Group Play-offs, and the losing nations were relegated to the World Group II Play-offs.

Russia vs. Chinese Taipei

Romania vs. Belgium

Ukraine vs. Australia

Italy vs. Slovakia

References 

World Group II